A choroidal fissure cyst is a cyst at the level of the choroidal fissure of the brain. They are usually asymptomatic and do not require treatment.

References

External links
 Radiopaedia: Choroidal fissure cyst

Neurological disorders